Doi Khun Tan National Park straddles the mountainous area of the Khun Tan Range in Lamphun and Lampang Provinces, northern Thailand.

Established in 1975 as Thailand's tenth national park, it is an IUCN Category V protected area measuring 159,556 rai ~ . The park ranges in elevation from 325–1,373 m.

Its best known feature is Thailand's longest railroad tunnel, 1,352 m long.

Climate
The three basic seasons are summer, from March–June; rainy season, from July–October; and winter, from November–February. The temperature varies from 38 degrees Celsius during the hot season to as cold as 5 degrees Celsius. Rainfall, which falls mostly during the rainy season, averages about 1,034 mm per year.

Flora and fauna
Human encroachment has disturbed the forests of Doi Khun Tan and they have changed dramatically in the past century. The forests can be divided into three types, with distinct elevation ranges.

Lowland elevations (325–850 m). Originally a teak forest, lower elevations are composed of a degraded, mixed bamboo deciduous forest and deciduous Dipterocarp-oak forest.

Middle elevations (850-1,000 meter). This is a transitional area where the lowland deciduous forest and upland evergreen-pine forest mix to form a mixed evergreen and deciduous forest. Here are only two species of pine trees in Thailand, a two–needle pine (Pinus merkusii) and three-needle pine (Pinus kesiya), both of which can be found here.

Upland elevations (1,000-1,373 m). The forest here is composed mostly of evergreen hardwood trees and a minority of pine (Pinus merkusii) to form an evergreen-pine forest. Much of the forest and watershed on the west side of the national park has been ravaged. More pristine conditions are found on the east side.

Doi Khun Tan offers year-round viewing of wild-flowers such as orchids and gingers. Doi Khun Tan is botanically very diverse, home to over 1,300 different vascular species. Numerous edible fungi are found in the park.

Some wildlife still exists in Doi Khun Tan, including the Siamese hare, porcupine, wild chicken, wild boar and weasel, as a variety of birds, reptiles, spiders and insects. The effects of hunting, logging, frequent fires, and human encroachment have greatly reduced their numbers. In the past, gibbons, tiger, elephants, bears, wild cattle, serow, slow loris, barking deer and many other species were also residents of Doi Khun Tan. Now they are all gone.

See also
Khun Tan Tunnel
Thai highlands
List of national parks of Thailand
List of Protected Areas Regional Offices of Thailand

References

External links

Doi Khun Tan National Park
Trekthailand - Doi Khun Tan National Park

National parks of Thailand
Protected areas established in 1975
IUCN Category V
Tourist attractions in Lamphun province
Tourist attractions in Lampang province
Geography of Lampang province
Geography of Lamphun province
1975 establishments in Thailand
Khun Tan Range